Essar Mahan Power Plant is a coal-based thermal power plant located near Singrauli town in Singrauli district in the Indian state of Madhya Pradesh. The power plant is operated by the Essar Energy.

Capacity
It has a planned capacity of 1200 MW (2x600 MW) of which 600 MW unit-1 is commissioned in December 2012 and 600 MW unit-2 commissioned in May 2017. Unit 3 was originally planned in Phase II expansion but was later shelved.

References

External links

 Mahan Super Thermal Power Project at SourceWatch

Coal-fired power stations in Madhya Pradesh
Singrauli district
2012 establishments in Madhya Pradesh
Energy infrastructure completed in 2012